The Chalet may refer to:
 The Chalet, Hunters Hill, heritage-listed residence in Hunter's Hill, New South Wales, Australia
 The Chalet (TV series), French television series 
 The Chalet School, series of 64 school story novels by Elinor M. Brent-Dyer 
 The Chalets, five-piece band from Dublin, Ireland

See also 

 Chalet (disambiguation)